Last Night is a 2010 romantic drama film that was written and directed by Massy Tadjedin, her directorial debut. The film follows married couple Joanna Reed (Keira Knightley) and Michael Reed (Sam Worthington), who are tempted by different forms of infidelity when they spend a night apart following a fight. Joanna is emotionally drawn to her ex-boyfriend Alex Mann (Guillaume Canet) while Michael is physically attracted to his co-worker Laura Nunez (Eva Mendes). The cast includes Griffin Dunne, Daniel Eric Gold, Anson Mount, Stephanie Romanov, Scott Adsit, Justine Cotsonas, and Chriselle Almeida. Last Night was produced by Entertainment One in association with the Gaumont Film Company, and deals with questions about emotional and physical infidelity.

The film was developed as a romance and suspense story before Tadjedin recognized its moral significance. After persuading Knightley to break a year-long acting hiatus to participate in the film, Tadjedin cast the other roles with consideration for the actors' chemistry. Mendes originally turned down the role of Laura but agreed to appear in the film after a conversation with Tadjedin. The soundtrack was composed by Clint Mansell, who received a World Soundtrack Award for Soundtrack Composer of the Year for his work.

Miramax Films initially bought Last Night for a March 19, 2010 release, but it was delayed by the company's sale to Filmyard Holdings. The film was shown at the 2010 Toronto International Film Festival and the 2010 Rome Film Festival. It premiered theatrically in France on February 16, 2011, and had a limited release in the United States on May 6, 2011. It was released through video on demand. Critics were divided over the film's plot and its commentary on infidelity; the performances from Knightley, Canet, and Mendes received praise while Worthington and the scenes between Michael and Laura were the subject of criticism. Last Night grossed $7.7 million primarily from foreign markets.

Plot
Joanna, a writer, and Michael Reed, a commercial real estate agent, are a married couple who share an apartment in New York City. During a party with Michael's colleagues, Joanna notices him spending time with Laura Nunez, an attractive co-worker, and wonders why he has not previously mentioned her. Joanna suspects Michael is having an affair and confronts him about it when they return home. They have an argument but reconcile later that night. The following day, Michael leaves on a business trip to Philadelphia with his associates Laura and Andy; Joanna stays behind to work on a novel. Joanna meets her ex-boyfriend Alex Mann; they go to a bar later that day, have a dinner with two of Alex's friends, Sandra and Truman, and they discuss their past relationship and Joanna's marriage to Michael; she has never told Michael about Alex.

Joanna and Alex return to Andy's apartment, where they talk about their previous romance, having got back together after Michael briefly broke off his relationship with Joanna. She goes out to walk Andy's dog; he accidentally locks them outside. They go to a party with Sandra, Truman, and the dog. Joanna and Alex grow closer over the course of the night, and they eventually kiss. After the party, they return to Alex's hotel room. Joanna refuses to have sex with Alex and they instead spend the night embracing each other in bed. The next day, Joanna and Alex kiss before he leaves New York broken-hearted.

Scenes depicting Joanna's night with Alex are interspersed with scenes showing Michael and Laura. After having dinner with a client, Laura invites Michael out for drinks at the hotel bar. They kiss but then Michael tells her he has never cheated on his wife. They go to the hotel pool, where they strip to their underwear and swim together. Laura asks Michael if he has ever been cheated on, and he says no. Laura replies that she was once cheated on by her partner, and she was angry for a month, but then reconciled. Her partner later died. She claims that had he not died, she would most likely still be there with Michael. They return to Laura's room and have sex. In the morning, Michael discovers a note from Joanna in which she apologizes for their fight and says she trusts him. Feeling guilty, Michael leaves Philadelphia early. Laura and Andy give their presentation to their clients without him.

Upon returning to their apartment, Michael finds Joanna crying. They make plans for the day in an attempt to resume their normal lives. They embrace and he says that he loves her. Joanna is puzzled by Michael's sudden show of affection and early return from work. Michael notices that Joanna left out a pair of expensive shoes from the night before and that she is wearing her sexiest underwear. The film ends as Joanna prepares to speak.

Cast 
The cast includes:

 Keira Knightley as Joanna Reed
 Sam Worthington as Michael Reed
 Eva Mendes as Laura Nunez
 Guillaume Canet as  Alex Mann
 Daniel Eric Gold as Andy
 Anson Mount as Neal
 Griffin Dunne as Truman
 Stephanie Romanov as Sandra
 Scott Adsit as Stuart
 Justine Cotsonas as Maggie
 Rae Ritke as Barbara
 Chriselle Almeida as Chris

Production

Development 

Massy Tadjedin wrote and filmed Last Night, which was her directorial debut after writing the screenplays for the films Leo (2002) and The Jacket (2005). She completed the script roughly four and a half years prior to its release; she developed the scenes out of sequence and wrote them with Microsoft Word. Tadjedin said she struggled with writing characters that "would come across as real people, that their struggle was believable".

After a negative response from a Warner Bros. studio executive on the script's formatting, she realized Final Draft was the preferred software for screenwriters. In early drafts, the story was set between Los Angeles and New Mexico; the setting was later changed to New York City, which Tadjedin described as a "place where the diverse characters could come together". She clarified that the location change did not affect the plot. because she wanted to portray the characters' relationships in a more universal context rather than tied to a specific city. Requesting seven million dollars for production, she had difficulty with financing the film, and rejected a potential source for not understanding her "artistic vision". The Los Angeles Times partially attributed the difficulty in selling Last Night to a film studio to it being an adult drama, which it described as "endangered in Hollywood".

Tadjedin pictured Last Night as a romance or a thriller at first, but realized its commentary on infidelity while assembling the cast and crew. Monogamy was identified by some media outlets as a related topic explored in the movie. Tadjedin likened Last Night to a slice of life story, a genre that she enjoyed in her childhood, while Griffin Dunne identified it more as a "moral thriller" due to its focus on "a universal passage in a long-term relationship". Critics compared the storyline and characters to those of a Woody Allen film, such as The Globe and Mail calling it "a New York morality play" set in Allen's "emotional and physical terrain". The Ottawa Sun described the tone as being "vaguely European-feeling" and "cosmopolitan".

Casting 

According to Tadjedin, the casting was "very chemistry dependent" to ensure each relationship felt authentic. She said the addition of Keira Knightley had "anchored the casting process". Knightley and Tadjedin had become friends following their collaboration on The Jacket. When asked if she had written Joanna for Knightley, Tadjedin said she imagined the character instead as a cross between Natalie Wood and Julie Christie. Last Night was Knightley's first project after a mental breakdown at the age of 22 and hiatus early in 2009; Knightley said her return to acting had helped improve her mental health. Tadjedin persuaded Knightley to be a part of Last Night while visiting her in Saint-Germain-des-Prés.

Knightley said that she was drawn to the film's commentary on physical versus emotional infidelity. When asked about her approach to Joanna, she said that she relied on her imagination and empathy for the character, clarifying she was not a method actress. During a 2018 interview with Peter Travers, Knightley cited Last Night as one of four films that meant the most to her; she enjoyed it for the collaboration with the cast and crew and its more naturalistic style of acting.

Tadjedin approached the male leads based on their chemistry with Knightley. After watching Sam Worthington in the 2004 film Somersault, Tadjedin sent him the script for Last Night, and met with him on-set for the 2009 film Avatar. She hired the actor due to his "great sympathy for the character of Michael" and her impression that he would have a "a great married chemistry" with Knightley. Tadjedin approached Guillaume Canet about his role during a screening of his 2006 film Tell No One. Some lines were cut between Knightley and Canet to focus on "their tension from looks". Tadjedin said that she wanted to represent the characters' anxiety through movement rather than dialogue.

Eva Mendes was cast as Laura based on the warmth she brought to the character. Reluctant to join the project, Mendes worried that Laura would "lack originality" and be "too seductive". She agreed to the part after meeting with Tadjedin, and said: "It was great to connect with a female director and talk about this woman and not objectify her as the other woman but give her a real true life and make her honest…. Thank God I did." Tadjedin emphasized that Laura was not written as a "homewrecker" or a "temptress".

Filming and post-production 
During production, Last Night was known as Tell Me. The location for Michael and Joanna's Tribeca apartment was found after a three-week search. Producers required a space with an elevator and enough room to accommodate a filming crew. Tadjedin wanted the apartment's furniture to represent the characters' personalities and the state of their relationship because the film does not depict their histories. She intended to portray Michael and Joanna as "a successful working couple" rather than "a very rarefied couple in New York", though she settled for the larger set due to time constraints. In reference to the film's overall look, she wanted to represent everyday life in downtown New York. Filming ended in the summer of 2009.

The actors used their natural accents for the characters, a decision Worthington had attributed to New York's identification as a melting pot. He asked Tadjedin to remove a line referencing Michael and Joanna taking a flight home, saying, "Don't fuckin' have me explain why I'm from Australia". Tadjedin explained that the international cast was not intentional, but said that "it felt really organic". While the cast represented multiple nationalities, the crew was entirely American. During production, the cast and crew discussed their views on infidelity and shared their personal experiences with each other.

The film was developed by Entertainment One in association with the Gaumont Film Company; its final cut runs for 92 minutes. The Gaumont Film Company financed Last Night, helped to release it in France, and handled sales. Gaumont CEO Christophe Riandee said the company acquired the movie to prove its "determination to go forward with high-end English-speaking productions". Tadjedin produced the film with Nick Wechsler and Sidonie Dumas. Wechsler had previously attempted to put Tadjedin's other scripts into production. Christophe Riandee and Buddy Enright were the executive producers, and Satsuki Mitchell was a co-producer. Susan E. Morse edited the film and the production design was handled by Tim Grimes. Peter Deming worked as the movie's director of photography, and Ann Roth created the costumes.

Soundtrack 

Clint Mansell composed the soundtrack for Last Night, and Peter Broderick wrote lyrics and provided vocals for certain parts. Following a request from Tadjedin, Broderick re-recorded his song "Not At Home" with Mansell for the film's final scene. Uncut described the music as "a step outside [of Mansell's] usual mixture of intense orchestral post-rock and intense moodiness"; according to Thomson the soundtrack is composed primarily of "melancholy piano pieces". Mansell said he felt the piano had a "sort of hypnotic" sound on the tracks.

Milan Records and Warner Classics released the soundtrack on an audio CD and as a digital download on March 27, 2012. Critics praised to the soundtrack, and Mansell was nominated for a World Soundtrack Award for Soundtrack Composer of the Year. The nomination was also for his music for the 2010 films Black Swan and Faster. HuffPost wrote Mansell created "a haunting score" that "lingers long after the film is over". Uncut praised the soundtrack as "a slight collection, but excellent for all that", although IndieWire criticized it as "mostly played out in the forgettable background".

Release and box office 
During the third week of its production, Miramax Films purchased Last Night for distribution. Originally set for a March 19, 2010 release, it was postponed following the company's closure. The Walt Disney Company, the parent company of Miramax Films, was initially "unwilling to do anything with the film for fear of stepping on the toes of Miramax's eventual buyer", but later allowed it to be shown at the 2010 Toronto International Film Festival, where it premiered as the closing film. Collider considered it to be "one of the more under-reported films". According to CinemaBlend.com, the film received a positive response from the festival's audience.

The film's distribution rights were acquired by Tribeca Film. Last Night was shown as the opener for the 2010 Rome Film Festival; the cast was unable to walk the red carpet for the movie due to protests by the Centoautori movement. The protest was held in response to Prime Minister Silvio Berlusconi's decision to stop tax exemptions for film productions and reduce funds for cultural events. As part of the festival, the film was one of sixteen nominated for the Golden Marc'Aurelio Award.

A preview of the movie was released online in March 2011. Last Night first premiered theatrically in France on February 16, 2011, and was made available on video on demand on April 20, 2011. The film had a limited release in ten US theaters on May 6, 2011, where it received an R rating from the Motion Picture Association of America due to language and sexuality. Prior to its theatrical premiere in 2011, Tadjedin and Deming received nominations for their directorial and cinematography work at the 2010 Camerimage awards.

Grossing $29,505 on its opening weekend, Last Night went on to earn $7,743,923 worldwide; $98,986 in the US and $7,644,937 from foreign markets. The film was removed from US theaters on June 2, 2011; it was later released in other countries between 2011 and 2017 through different distributors. It grossed the most ($2,386,504) in France and the least ($3,026) in New Zealand, following its premiere there on October 12, 2017. Last Night was released on home video and streaming services on August 1, 2011; it was made available on iTunes and Netflix. The film was later packaged as part of the Echo Bridge Home Entertainment release Epic Romances with Anna Karenina (1948), As You Like It (1936), The Magic Sword (1962), and The Strange Love of Martha Ivers (1946).

Critical reception 
Critics praised Tadjedin for not supporting or antagonizing Joanna or Michael. DVD Talk commended Tadjedin for not reducing the characters to "the monsters and angels normally created for cinematic takes on infidelity". In an Entertainment Weekly review, Owen Gleiberman liked that the film examined infidelity beyond only sex. While giving the film a positive review, Hot Press wrote that the effectiveness of its message was entirely "dependent on the viewer's own experiences". Other reviewers criticized the lead characters as boring, including some questioning why the plot was worth caring about. Digital Spy criticized it as a "mostly hollow experience" with a "distinct lack of flesh on the plot's bare bones". Last Nights plot and characters were described as lacking the "appetite for lunatic adventure" of Woody Allen's works, or the emotional stakes of the 2009 film I Am Love. Despite their negative reviews of the overall film, The Japan Times and Politico praised its ending for its ambiguity; Politico described the final scene as an "unconventional and exciting moment" comparable to the jump cuts in the 1992 film Husbands and Wives.

Critics highlighted Knightley, Canet, and Mendes for their performances. Filmmaker said Knightley provided "a layered portrayal of a woman at a crossroads she doesn’t know she’s at", and The A.V. Club likened it to a "Michelle Williams-style moodiness". Interview cited her delivery of the line "What I wouldn’t give to have tired of you" as an example of her "quietly devastating performance". Despite finding Joanna unsympathetic, The Japan Times praised Knightley's ability to convey pain on screen. Filmmaker singled out Canet and Mendes for creating "original beats in their roles as possible paramours"; The Hollywood Reporter preferred their characters over Joanna and Michael. Mendes was praised as "particularly appealing" by Variety, and for "resisting the urge to overdo (and overvamp) her role the way a lesser actress would" by DVD Talk. Some critics attributed Mendes' character and performance as her way of avoiding typecasting related to her appearance. On the other hand, Politico criticized Canet for appearing more "creepy and presumptuous rather than romantic and sad".

Worthington received criticism for his performance. DVD Talk cited his "dull and lifeless" acting as the film's main problem, and Slant Magazine noted his "idea of underplaying is to go blank". Politico criticized both Worthington and Knightley for being too "tepid" and not realizing their roles' potential. Michael's storyline with Laura was poorly received, particularly in comparison to the scenes between Joanna and Alex. IndieWire did not believe Tadjedin established enough why Michael and Laura have sex beyond a shared physical attraction. Criticizing Worthington and Mendes as lacking chemistry, The Globe and Mail wrote that the pool scene was "ridiculously prim" and Laura was too "tired and remote" with Michael. Other critics said the film was too unbalanced, preferring Joanna over Michael. Den of Geek! wanted the story to be "a little more even-handed towards Michael's character", and The Boston Globe wished Tadjedin was more "generous with the rest of the cast as she is with Knightley".

References

Citations

Book sources

External links
 
 
 

2010 films
American romantic drama films
Films about infidelity
Films scored by Clint Mansell
Films shot in New York City
French romantic drama films
English-language French films
2010 directorial debut films
2010s English-language films
2010s American films
2010s French films